"Secret Garden" is a song by American musician Bruce Springsteen. It was originally released as a single from his Greatest Hits album on February 27, 1995, on Columbia Records. Upon its initial release, it peaked at number 63 on the Billboard Hot 100.

"Secret Garden" was re-released on April 11, 1997, through Sony as a two-track single, of which also featured a live version of "Thunder Road". (An EP was also released in 1995, featuring two versions of "Secret Garden" ("album" and "string"), live versions of "Murder Incorporated" and "Thunder Road" and the original version of "Pink Cadillac" from Greatest Hits.) This re-issue returned the song to the Hot 100, where it peaked at number 19 and remains Springsteen's final top-20 hit in the United States to date.

The song gained much of its popularity after being featured on the soundtrack for the 1996 movie Jerry Maguire peaking at number 12 and number 15 on the Adult Top 40 and Top 40 Mainstream respectively.

"Secret Garden" was also featured in the film Night at the Roxbury and the TV show It's Always Sunny in Philadelphia. The song was also synced with producer Gary Dell'Abate's 'Love Tape' to his ex-girlfriend on The Howard Stern Show. It was featured in the Cold Case episode, "Ravaged", in 2005, and was featured along with 10 other Springsteen songs in the HBO miniseries Show Me a Hero.

The song has been performed only a handful of times live. It was performed three times in 1995 in New York, and one time on the Reunion Tour in 2000. The song returned to the setlist once in 2013 when Springsteen performed it in the United Kingdom. After a three-year hiatus, Springsteen performed it twice in 2016 in New Jersey and Washington, D.C., and once in 2017 in Brisbane, Australia.

Critical reception
Steve Baltin from Cash Box praised the song, noting that it is a ballad that follows in the footsteps of the softer material from his Human Touch and Lucky Town albums." He added that featuring the reunited E Street Band, "it is one of the prettier melodics Springsteen has ever come up with. Meaning that with his recent Grammy success and the success of previous ballads (“I’m On Fire”), this could be a monster hit. lt'd be hard to find a more deserving song than this one, as Springsteen once again puts the words and melody together to show why, despite the knocks he took in ’92, he remains alone at the top." 

In 1997, British magazine Music Week rated "Secret Garden" three out of five, describing it as a "melancholic track". They also added that "this keyboard-led, introspective love song is low key, sparse and touching."

Track listing
"Secret Garden" – 4:29
"Secret Garden - string version" – 4:38
"Murder Incorporated - live version" – 5:50
"Thunder Road - Live" – 5:29

Charts

Weekly charts

Year-end charts

Certifications

References

Bruce Springsteen songs
1995 singles
1997 singles
Songs written by Bruce Springsteen
Columbia Records singles
Sony Music singles
1995 songs